Synaphe predotalis is a species of moth of the family Pyralidae described by Hans Zerny in 1927. It is found in Spain and Tunisia.

Taxonomy
Synaphe predotalis is sometimes treated as a subspecies of Synaphe chellalalis.

References

Moths described in 1927
Pyralini